The Fullerton School District is a school district in California, with its headquarters in Fullerton. The school district serves the city of Fullerton, as well as small portions of La Habra, Brea, and Buena Park. It has schools from grades Kindergarten through 8th grade. High school students are transferred to the Fullerton Joint Union High School District.

Schools

K-8 schools:
 Beechwood K-8
 Fisler K-8

Junior high schools
 Ladera Vista
 Nicolas
 Parks

Elementary schools:
 Acacia
 Commonwealth
 Fern Drive
 Golden Hill
 Hermosa Drive
 Laguna Road
 Maple
 It was established in 1924, making it the oldest school in Fullerton School District. Its initial building had one story. A 1933 earthquake caused damage, and the building from that point on was one story. In the 1970s area courts required school districts to move minority children into other schools as part of school busing, and the school district closed the school in 1972. From that point toward, it served as a preschool and a community center. A neighborhood committee circa the 1990s advocated for the school to reopen as the district was finding its schools to be overcrowded. It reopened with kindergarten in 1996 and added a new grade level each year. Jerry Hicks of the Los Angeles Times wrote that the community wanted the school back even though it meant that de facto segregation would increase.
 Orangethorpe
 Pacific Drive
 Raymond
 Richman
 Rolling Hills
 Sunset Lane
 Valencia Park
 Woodcrest

References

External links

 

School districts in Orange County, California
Education in Fullerton, California
Educational institutions in the United States with year of establishment missing